The Red Line is one of three light rail routes on the METRORail network operated by METRO in Houston, Texas. It is the oldest line in the METRORail system, with the first  section of the line between Fannin South and UH–Downtown opening on January 1, 2004.

Construction on a  extension to the north began July 2009, and was expected to continue until 2014, though the opening date was later pushed back to 2015. On December 8, 2011, the FTA announced the award of a $450 million grant from the New Starts transit program to fund construction of the Red Line. Better than expected construction progress eventually led to the new line opening ahead of schedule on December 21, 2013.

Route
The approximately  Red Line runs through the heart of the historic North Side, a storied neighborhood rooted in rail that came into being with the expansion, in the 1880s, of the Hardy Rail Line. It largely parallels Interstate 45.

Description

Starting at Fannin South, the Red Line travels parallel to Fannin Street, crossing under I-610, until it shifts onto Greenbriar Drive. It turns onto South Braeswood Boulevard briefly before returning to Fannin Street, which it follows through the Texas Medical Center. Through the Museum District, trains travel on one-way streets: southbound trains use Fannin Street, while northbound trains move onto San Jacinto Street. The tracks rejoin just south of I-69 before merging onto Main Street, which it follows through Midtown and Downtown. Along this stretch, the line intersects with the eastbound Green Line and Purple Line at Rusk Street and the westbound lines at Capitol Street. The tracks eventually move onto the west side of Main Street as they approach  station, the original terminus of the line, located adjacent to the University of Houston–Downtown campus.

Since 2013, the Red Line continues north, following Main Street through the Burnett Transit Center and on to Boundary Street, where it crosses east to Fulton Street, and proceeds north on Fulton through the Near Northside to its current terminus at the Northline Transit Center, located adjacent to the Northline campus of the Houston Community College.

Infrastructure

As with the other METRORail lines, the Red Line is predominantly at-grade and street running, with paved tracks laid down the median of Main Street in downtown, Fannin Street to the south, and Fulton Street to the north. These tracks are not physically separated from road traffic, though they are located in dedicated lanes and trains receive priority at intersections at cross-streets by means of preempted traffic signals. However, flashing grade crossing signals and gates are present where trains cross parallel traffic lanes as they move from one street to another, and along the section of the line south of Old Spanish Trail, where tracks are laid out on a right-of-way parallel to the road rather than in the median. Two sections along the Red Line extension north of UH–Downtown, though, are located on elevated structures: the Burnett Transit Center and the tracks leading to and from it, and a grade-separated crossing of a freight line along Fulton Street south of the Northline Transit Center.

The line is fully double-tracked, with stations mainly consisting of a single island platform serving trains in both directions outside the central section along Main Street. However, the Main Street section of the line have split platform designs where platforms are located on both sides of a cross-intersection between the two tracks, each of which serve trains in one direction only, as do the side platforms on parallel streets at Museum District station.

Rolling stock
Services on the Red Line are operated mainly by Metro's two generations of Siemens S70 LRVs: the H1 series delivered in 2004 for the opening of the initial section, the H2 series delivered in 2012 for the Northline extension and the H4 in 2022 for future expansions. Since 2015, H3 series CAF Urbos LRVs, which are mostly used on the Green and Purple Lines, can also been found on the Red Line. Trains are generally formed by two units coupled together.

Stations
The following is a list of stations for this line, listed in order from north to south.

METRORail line key
 Green Line Purple Line

Expansion 
A possibility for expansion of the line would take the route to George Bush Intercontinental Airport.

References

External links
METRO Official Website
METRO Solutions
Go METRORail

METRORail